Allensworth is an unincorporated community in Tulare County, California. Established by Allen Allensworth in 1908, the town was the first in California to be founded, financed, and governed by African-Americans.  

The original townsite is designated as Colonel Allensworth State Historic Park. The 2010 United States census reported Allensworth's population was 471. For statistical purposes, the United States Census Bureau has defined Allensworth as a census-designated place (CDP).

The community is located in the ZIP Code 93219 and in the area code 661.

History

On June 30, 1908, clergyman Colonel Allen Allensworth and Denison University graduate Professor William Alexander Payne established the California Colony and Home Promoting Association. Allensworth and Payne were the chief officers, with the other constituents being miner John W. Palmer; minister William H. Peck; and real estate agent Harry A. Mitchell (all of which were Black men). The Association purchased 20 acres of land from the Pacific Farming Company with the goal of establishing a town for Black soldiers. The land was situated at the then-extant Santa Fe rail line stop, titled "Solita." The land was divided into individual parcels, forming "a colony of orderly and industrious African Americans who could control their own destiny."

Allensworth's reputation drew many from all over the country to the town, causing some to buy property sight-unseen in order to support the efforts. In the early 20th century, the area boasted a great boom and hosted California's first African American school district by 1910.

The town was especially reported upon in 1912 to 1915, the period considered its apex as a thriving community. Its growth was reported in The New York Age, the California Eagle (which emphasized that "there is not a single white person having anything to do with the affairs of the colony") and the Los Angeles Times, which labelled Allensworth as the "ideal Negro settlement."

By 1914, the town had established a schoolhouse, thereby becoming California’s first African American school district. It also had a courthouse, a Baptist church, a hotel, and a Tulare County library.

However, multiple complications occurred in 1914. The Santa Fe rail system moved its railroad stop from Allenstown to Alpaugh. In September 1914, Colonel Allensworth died in Monrovia, California, where he was struck by a motorcycle while crossing the street. The town experienced extreme losses, coupled with severe drought and decreased crop yields. Despite this, the 1915 voting registration showed "farmers, storekeepers, carpenters, nurses and more, all suggesting that the colony’s business and industrial output was prodigious."

Many residents left the area following World War I. 

The California Colony and Home Promoting Association's 1929 blueprint of Allensworth is available for viewership online via the California State Archives.

The town of Allensworth was scheduled for demolition in 1966 when arsenic was found in the water supply.

Legacy 
The town was memorialized as a state park in 1974, and hosts seasonal events to preserve its history, which garner "thousands of visitors" from around the state. The area around the park is inhabited. In 1976, the Colonel Allensworth Historic Park was established, a process which was started by Cornelius Ed Pope. Historic buildings from 1908-1918 have been restored in the town center.

A number of the restored buildings are at the center of the 2022 documentary film Allensworth by James Benning. The film had its U.S. premiere at the 2022 Denver Film Festival and its European premiere at the 2023 Berlinale.

Geography
Allensworth marks the eastern high-water shoreline of Tulare Lake, (once the largest U.S. lake outside the Great Lakes,) which supported one of the largest Indian populations on the continent, herds of elk, millions of water fowl, as well as a commercial fishery and ferry service. Other townsites located on this historic shoreline include Lemoore on its northern tip, and Kettleman City on the western shore, while nearby Alpaugh is on the eastern end of a long, sandy ridge at elevation 210 ft. that was once called Hog Island.  Due to diversions of the natural waterways since the mid to late 19th century, only a tiny remnant of Tulare Lake now remains. The last time Tulare Lake was full and overflowed its spillway (near Lemoore) was 1878.

Just north of Allensworth is the Pixley National Wildlife Refuge,  grassland and wetland habitats operated by the Department of the Interior, US Fish and Wildlife Service. Of great interest, thousands of sandhill cranes (Grus canadensis), use this refuge each winter from November through March. Red-tailed hawks (Buteo jamaicensis), are among the 141 type of birds that can be seen here. Burrowing owls are sometimes present. Also present are Pacific pond turtles, once an important part of Tulare Lake's  fishery trade with San Francisco.

Adjacent to the town is Allensworth Ecological Reserve. The endangered San Joaquin kit fox (Vulpes macrotis mutica) can be found in this area.

According to the United States Census Bureau, the CDP covers an area of 3.1 square miles (8.0 km2), all of it land.

Demographics

The 2010 United States Census reported that Allensworth had a population of 471. The racial makeup of Allensworth was 158 (33.5%) White, 22 (4.7%) African American, 0 (0.0%) Native American, 8 (1.7%) Asian, 0 (0.0%) Pacific Islander, 279 (59.2%) from other races, and 4 (0.8%) from two or more races. Hispanic or Latino of any race were 436 persons (92.6%).

The Census reported that 471 people (100% of the population) lived in households, 0 (0%) lived in non-institutionalized group quarters, and 0 (0%) were institutionalized.

There were 115 households, out of which 69 (60.0%) had children under the age of 18 living in them, 67 (58.3%) were opposite-sex married couples living together, 20 (17.4%) had a female householder with no husband present, 11 (9.6%) had a male householder with no wife present.  There were 10 (8.7%) unmarried opposite-sex partnerships, and 1 (0.9%) same-sex married couples or partnerships. 13 households (11.3%) were made up of individuals, and 7 (6.1%) had someone living alone who was 65 years of age or older. The average household size was 4.10.  There were 98 families (85.2% of all households); the average family size was 4.37.

The population was spread out, with 187 people (39.7%) under the age of 18, 66 people (14.0%) aged 18 to 24, 100 people (21.2%) aged 25 to 44, 93 people (19.7%) aged 45 to 64, and 25 people (5.3%) who were 65 years of age or older.  The median age was 23.4 years. For every 100 females, there were 97.1 males.  For every 100 females age 18 and over, there were 98.6 males.

The homeowner vacancy rate was 0%; the rental vacancy rate was 11.8%.  220 people (46.7% of the population) lived in owner-occupied housing units and 251 people (53.3%) lived in rental housing units.

Education
The Allensworth School District hosts a single school serving grades K through 8. That school is named Allensworth Elementary School.

Government

References

External links

 Friends of Allensworth
 Friends of Allensworth San Diego Chapter No 12
 "America's Heartland": Allensworth

Census-designated places in Tulare County, California
African-American history of California
Census-designated places in California
Populated places established in 1980
1908 establishments in California
Populated places established by African Americans